Paul Mescal (born 2 February 1996) is an Irish actor. Born in Maynooth, he studied acting at The Lir Academy and subsequently performed in plays in Dublin theatres. Mescal rose to fame with his role in the miniseries Normal People (2020), earning a BAFTA TV Award and a nomination for a Primetime Emmy Award.

Mescal made his film debut with a supporting role in the psychological drama The Lost Daughter (2021), and he received praise for starring in the 2022 drama films God's Creatures and Aftersun. His performance as a troubled father in the latter earned him nominations for an Academy Award and BAFTA Film Award. In 2022, he began performing as Stanley Kowalski in a revival of the play A Streetcar Named Desire, for which he received a nomination for a Laurence Olivier Award.

Early life and education
Mescal was born on 2 February 1996 in Maynooth, County Kildare,  to Dearbhla, a Garda officer, and Paul, a schoolteacher who acted semi-professionally as well. The eldest of three children, he has a brother and a sister. He attended Maynooth Post Primary School. He was a minor and under-21 Gaelic football player for Kildare and a member of the Maynooth GAA club. Gaelic footballer Brian Lacey praised Mescal's skills as a defender, while physical trainer Cian O'Neill described him as "mature beyond his years ... very developed and very strong". He gave up the sport after a jaw injury. Mescal performed on stage for the first time at age 16, portraying the titular Phantom in the musical The Phantom of the Opera, after which he auditioned and gained admission to The Lir Academy at Trinity College Dublin. Mescal graduated with a Bachelor of Arts in Acting in 2017. He secured agents for his acting career prior to his graduation.

Career

Theatre and television roles (2017–2020)
Upon obtaining his Bachelor of Arts degree, Mescal was offered roles in two theatre productions, Angela's Ashes and The Great Gatsby; he took on the latter and starred as the titular Jay Gatsby at the Gate Theatre in Dublin. The Irish Times Peter Crawley highlighted his work as a "butterfly of self-creation among an ensemble in constant motion and fluttering improvisation". He also portrayed the Prince in a contemporary retelling of Hans Christian Andersen's The Red Shoes at the same theatre that year. Mescal appeared in the world premiere of the 2018 play Asking for It by Louise O'Neill at the Abbey Theatre in Dublin; Steve Cummins of The Times commended his distinctive performance. That same year, Mescal made his London stage debut in The Plough and the Stars at the Lyric Hammersmith and starred in the Rough Magic Theatre Company's productions of A Midsummer Night's Dream for the Kilkenny Arts Festival and A Portrait of the Artist as a Young Man for the Dublin Theatre Festival. In 2020, he performed in the play The Lieutenant of Inishmore at Dublin's Gaiety Theatre.

Mescal starred in his first television role in the drama miniseries Normal People, an adaptation of the 2018 novel of the same name by Sally Rooney. It premiered in the UK on BBC Three and in the US on Hulu in 2020. He played student Connell Waldron; he viewed the role as different from himself in the way Waldron's traits include hesitance and emotional unavailability. Like the actor did in real life, the character plays Gaelic football and attends Trinity College. The role propelled Mescal to fame. He earned acclaim as well as the BAFTA TV Award for Best Actor for his performance. In their respective reviews for Variety and Slate, Caroline Framke called Mescal's navigation through the character's emotional collapse "breathtaking", while Willa Paskin noted his concurrent embodiment of "intelligence, insecurity and quiet confidence". He also received nominations for the Primetime Emmy Award for Outstanding Lead Actor in a Limited Series or Movie and the Critics' Choice Television Award for Best Actor in a Movie/Miniseries.

Mescal starred in Drifting, a short film, which was screened at the 2020 Galway Film Fleadh. He played a firefighter in the Channel 5 miniseries The Deceived and appeared in the music video for the song "Scarlet" by The Rolling Stones in August. Reviewing The Deceived, The Independent critic Ed Power highlighted Mescal's effortless "sleepy-eyed charm" and "flawless" Donegal accent.

Film career (2021–present)

Mescal made his feature film debut with a supporting role in The Lost Daughter, directed by Maggie Gyllenhaal in her directorial debut. Released in 2021, the psychological drama garnered favourable reviews. The following year, Mescal starred as a man accused of sexual assault in the psychological drama God's Creatures and as a troubled young father in the drama Aftersun, both of which premiered at the 2022 Cannes Film Festival. The two films received positive reviews, with Mescal's performances gaining praise. IndieWire critic Kate Erbland found Mescal's work in God's Creatures "powerful" and "quietly chilling". Reviewing Aftersun, Peter Travers of ABC News highlighted his "disarming charm and elemental power" in his portrayal of a "complex role". He received nominations for the Academy Award for Best Actor and the BAFTA Award for Best Actor in a Leading Role for the latter.

Mescal starred in Carmen, a contemporary film adaptation of the opera of the same name. It premiered at the 2022 Toronto International Film Festival and will be theatrically released in 2023. He began playing Stanley Kowalski in a revival of the play A Streetcar Named Desire by Tennessee Williams at the Almeida Theatre in December 2022. The production garnered acclaim The Timess Dominic Maxwell found Mescal "tremendous" and opined that he "makes the latent violence of Stanley Kowalski into something easy, tangible, vibrant yet unactorly", and Mescal has received a nomination for the Laurence Olivier Award for Best Actor. The production is scheduled to transfer to the West End in March 2023.

Mescal will next star in Foe, an adaptation of the novel of the same name by Iain Reid, and in Strangers, an adaptation of Taichi Yamada's novel of the same name. He replaced Blake Jenner in the lead role of  composer Franklin Shepard in Richard Linklater's Merrily We Roll Along, a film adaptation of the 1981 musical of the same name, which is set be filmed over 20 years.

Personal life
Mescal speaks the Irish language. He moved from his native Ireland to London in 2020. He stated in 2022 that he had purchased a property in Ireland, with the intention of spending time there when he is not working. Mescal is open about seeing a therapist, which he says is "to keep sane".

Mescal plays the piano, and has performed covers of songs with his sister, Nell. In July 2020, the actor performed spoken word and sang with Irish singer Dermot Kennedy at the London Natural History Museum. He participated in a virtual stage reading of the play This Is Our Youth by Kenneth Lonergan as part of a series to benefit the Actors Fund of America charity in October of the same year.

Mescal was in a relationship with singer Phoebe Bridgers. He appeared in Bridgers' music video for the song "Savior Complex", directed by Phoebe Waller-Bridge.

Filmography

Film

Television

Music videos

Theatre

Accolades

References

External links

1996 births
21st-century Irish male actors
Alumni of Trinity College Dublin
Best Actor BAFTA Award (television) winners
Gaelic football backs
Irish expatriates in England
Irish male stage actors
Irish male television actors
Irish male film actors
Kildare Gaelic footballers
Living people
Male actors from County Kildare
People associated with Trinity College Dublin
People from Maynooth